Paranoia is a 2021 Indonesian thriller drama film directed and co-written by Riri Riza, produced by long-time collaborator Mira Lesmana. The film stars Nirina Zubir, Nicholas Saputra, Caitlin North Lewis and Lukman Sardi.

The film had its world premiere at the 25th Bucheon International Fantastic Film Festival in July 2021.

Premise
Dina runs away with her daughter, Laura, after her abusive husband Gion gets imprisoned. However, Gion is released from the prison due to the pandemic. This situation stresses her out and she is afraid Gion will find them. Meanwhile, Raka, a mysterious man appears in their life and makes things more complicated.

Cast
Nirina Zubir as Dina
Lukman Sardi as Gion
Caitlin North Lewis as Laura
Nicholas Saputra as Raka

Release
Paranoia had its world premiere at the 25th Bucheon International Fantastic Film Festival. It is set to screen theatrically on 11 November 2021.

Accolades

References

2021 thriller drama films
Indonesian thriller drama films
Films directed by Riri Riza
2020s Indonesian-language films